Among the Living is a 1941 American film noir directed by Stuart Heisler and starring Albert Dekker, Susan Hayward, Harry Carey and Frances Farmer. The film is a mix of social drama, horror film, and suspense thriller.

Premise

Albert Dekker plays twin brothers, John and Paul. Paul supposedly died when he was 10, but actually went insane and was kept in a secret room in his parents' mansion.

Cast
 Albert Dekker as John Raden / Paul Raden
 Susan Hayward as Millie Pickens
 Harry Carey as Dr. Ben Saunders
 Frances Farmer as Elaine Raden
 Gordon Jones as Bill Oakley
 Jean Phillips as Peggy Nolan
 Ernest Whitman as Pompey
 Maude Eburne as  Mrs. Pickens
 Frank M. Thomas as Sheriff
 Harlan Briggs as Judge
 Archie Twitchell as Tom Reilly
 Dorothy Sebastian as Woman in Cafe
 William Stack as Minister

Reception
Time Out Paris called the film "a gripping piece of Southern Gothic".  Ted Shen of the Chicago Reader wrote, "The cinematography is gloomy and noirish but the psychology is simplistic".

References

External links

  
  
 
 
 Among the Living at FilmFanatic
 

1941 films
1941 horror films
American horror thriller films
American black-and-white films
Film noir
Paramount Pictures films
Films directed by Stuart Heisler
1940s English-language films
1940s horror thriller films
Films with screenplays by Garrett Fort
Films about twin brothers
1940s American films